

The UTIAS Ornithopter No.1 (registration C-GPTR) is an ornithopter that was built in Canada in the late 1990s. On 8 July 2006, it took off under its own power, assisted by a turbine jet engine, making a flight of around 300 metres that lasted 14 seconds.

Specifications

See also
UTIAS Snowbird

References

External links
 
 
 
 

2000s Canadian experimental aircraft
Ornithopter No.1
Ornithopters
Aircraft with auxiliary jet engines
Aircraft first flown in 2006